Flax (Linum usitatissimum) is a plant cultivated for food and fiber in cooler regions of the world.

Flax may also refer to:

 Flax (color), a pale yellowish-gray color
 Flax (moth), a genus of moths
 Holly Flax, a fictional character from the American TV series The Office
 Ken Flax (born 1963), American Olympic hammer thrower
 Flax Art Supply Stores, a group of art supply stores in the United States

Plants
 Linum, flaxes, a genus of approximately 200 species of flowering plants, including Linum usitatissimum 
 Cannabis sativa, an annual herbaceous flowering plant better known as hemp
 Santolina rosmarinifolia, holy flax, a species of flowering plant in the daisy family Asteraceae
 Phormium, New Zealand flax or flax lily
 Phormium tenax, flax or New Zealand flax
 Phormium colensoi, mountain flax or lesser New Zealand flax

See also
Flaxen (disambiguation)